Philip Byrne (born 6 April 1982 in Dublin) is an Irish footballer. He plays for Carrick Rangers.

In 2004, Byrne was signed by then Kildare County manager Eric Hannigan from Shelbourne. He has been a dependable fixture at the centre of the Kildare County defence for both Hannigan and current manager Ryan. Philip was awarded the Supporters Club Player of the Year in his debut season for the club in 2004. He was selected as Kildare County's captain for the 2007 season. He picked up a special award for his 100th appearance in April 2007 before Kildare's League Match versus Finn Harps. He left the club after four years at the end of the 2007 season signing for newly formed Sporting Fingal. In January 2010, Byrne joined Longford Town where he was club captain for the 2010 season before being released at the season's end.

In January 2012 he signed for Carrick Rangers .

Personal life
His father Damien Byrne was also a League of Ireland player.

References

Republic of Ireland association footballers
League of Ireland players
Living people
1982 births
Association footballers from Dublin (city)
Shelbourne F.C. players
Kildare County F.C. players
Sporting Fingal F.C. players
Longford Town F.C. players
Monaghan United F.C. players
Carrick Rangers F.C. players
NIFL Premiership players
Belvedere F.C. players
Association football central defenders